Yeşilyayla is a village in the Çelikhan District, Adıyaman Province, Turkey. The village is populated by Kurds of the Reşwan tribe and had a population of 86 in 2021.

The hamlet of Eskiköy is attached to Yeşilyayla.

References

Villages in Çelikhan District

Kurdish settlements in Adıyaman Province